Savitri is a 2016 Telugu action romantic-comedy  film directed by Pavan Sadineni, produced by Dr. V. B. Rajendra Prasad on Vision Filmmakers banner. It stars Nara Rohit and Nanditha in the lead roles.

It is a modern adaptation of the Indian folktale of Savitri and Satyavan.

Plot
Savitri (Nanditha) is crazy about getting married right from her childhood days. In fact, she was born during her relative's marriage. With this being her sole aim, she convinces her family to find a suitable groom for her. Her family decides to get Savitri married to Rishi (Nara Rohit), although both of them are not aware of this decision. While on her way to Shiridi, Savitri meets Rishi, who instantly falls in love with her even though she is not interested. Due to some circumstances, both of them miss the train. During their journey to catch the train, Rishi tells his family that he is not interested in marrying the girl they chose as he is in love with someone now. Later Rishi finds out that Savitri was the one he was going to marry. He explains the mistake he made to Savitri's father who does not agree to the union. Rishi stays in the same village for a month and convinces Savitri's entire family and wins his love.

Cast

 Nara Rohit as Rishi
 Nanditha Raj as Savitri
 Posani Krishna Murali
 Murali Sharma as Dora Babu
 Ajay as Dora Babu's brother
 Ravi Babu
 Jeeva
 Vennela Kishore as NRI
 Satyam Rajesh
 Sreemukhi
 Dhanya Balakrishna as Gayathri
 Satya
 Madhunandan
 Pammi Sai as Rishi's friend
 Prabhas Sreenu
 Shakalaka Shankar

Production

Filming 
The film was launched on 27 June 2015 in Hyderabad.

Soundtrack

Shravan, who worked with Sadineni in his previous directorial venture, Prema Ishq Kaadhal, was roped in to compose the soundtrack and background score. The soundtrack was released on 4 March 2016 at a glittering ceremony with Nandamuri Balakrishna as chief guest.

References

External links
 

2016 films
Films about Indian weddings
Films set on trains
2010s Telugu-language films
Savitri and Satyavan